The Sanjak of Gümülcine (Ottoman Turkish: Sancak-i Gümülcine) was a second-level province (sanjak) of the Ottoman Empire in Thrace, forming part of the Adrianople Vilayet. Its capital was Gümülcine, modern Komotini in Greece.

History and administrative division 
The sanjak of Gümülcine was created in 1878 out of the territory of the sanjaks of Gallipoli and Filibe (Plovdiv) from the Adrianople Vilayet, as well as parts of the sanjak of Drama of the Salonica Vilayet.

It comprised six sub-provinces or kazas, which were further subdivided into nahiyes:

 Kaza of Gümülcine (mod. Komotini): Seyh Cumaya, Kirli or Girli, Çakal, Celebiye, Şehir (Gümülcine urban area), Saphane, Yasi, Maronya, Kura-i Cedid
 Kaza of Sultan Yeri (mod. Krumovgrad): Ada, Tashli, Güve, Teke, Mestanlı
 Kaza of Ahi Çelebi (mod. Smoljan): Ismilan, Çitak, Karsili, Pasavik, Tozburun, Söğütçük
 Kaza of İskeçe (mod. Xanthi): Yenice, Sakar Kaya, Celepli, Cedid, Yassiören
 Kaza of Eğri Dere (mod. Ardino): Mesgulli, Küçük Viran, Davud, Hotaşlı and Dolastir, Rupçoz (retroceded by Bulgaria in 1886)
 Kaza of Dari Dere (mod. Zlatograd): Şahin, Ak Bunar

The sanjak survived until it was occupied by Bulgarian troops in the First Balkan War (1912–1913), after which it came under Bulgarian control. In 1919, after World War I, the southern portions came under Allied administration with the Treaty of Neuilly, and in 1920 they came under Greek control, forming the prefectures of Xanthi and Rhodope.

References

Sanjaks of the Ottoman Empire in Europe
Ottoman Greece
Ottoman period in the history of Bulgaria
History of Western Thrace
1878 establishments in the Ottoman Empire
Komotini
Ottoman Thrace
Adrianople vilayet
1912 disestablishments in the Ottoman Empire